Hungund Assembly seat is one of 224 assembly constituencies in Karnataka, India. It is part of Bagalkot (Lok Sabha constituency).

Assembly Members

Bombay State
 1951: S. R. Kanthi, Indian National Congress

Mysore State
 1957: S. R. Kanthi, Indian National Congress
 1962: S. R. Kanthi, Indian National Congress
 1967: S. R. Kanthi, Indian National Congress
 1970 (By-Poll): G. P. Nanjayyanamath (Gadagaya Parayya Nanjayyanamath), Indian National Congress (Jagjivanram Group) (Congress-R) (NCJ)
 1972: Nagaral Sangappa Balappa, Indian National Congress

Karnataka State
 1978:	Kavashetti Shankarappa Sugurappa, Independent
 1983:	Kadapatti Shivasangappa Siddappa, Janata Party
 1985:	Kadapatti Shivasangappa Siddappa, Janata Party
 1989:	Kashappanavar Shivashankarappa Rachappa, Indian National Congress
 1994:	Kashappanavar Shivashankarappa Rachappa, Indian National Congress
 1999:	Kashappanavar Shivashankarappa Rachappa, Indian National Congress
 2003 (By-Poll):	Kashappanavar Gouramma Shivashankarappa, Indian National Congress
 2004:	Doddanagouda Gundana Gowda Patil, Bharatiya Janata Party
 2008:	Doddanagouda Gundana Gowda Patil, Bharatiya Janata Party
 2013:	Kashappanavar Vijayanand Shivashankrappa, Indian National Congress
 2018: Doddanagouda Gundana Gowda Patil, Bharatiya Janata Party

See also
 List of constituencies of the Karnataka Legislative Assembly

References

Assembly constituencies of Karnataka
Bagalkot district